Thiago Martins Bueno (born 17 March 1995 in São João Evangelista), known as Thiago Martins, is a Brazilian footballer who plays as a centre back for New York City FC.

Honours

Club
Palmeiras
Campeonato Brasileiro Série B: 2013
Campeonato Brasileiro Série A: 2016

Yokohama F. Marinos
J1 League: 2019

New York City FC
Campeones Cup: 2022

Individual
 J.League Best XI: 2019

References

External links

1995 births
Living people
Sportspeople from Minas Gerais
Brazilian footballers
Association football defenders
Campeonato Brasileiro Série A players
Campeonato Brasileiro Série B players
Yokohama F. Marinos players
Mogi Mirim Esporte Clube players
Sociedade Esportiva Palmeiras players
Paysandu Sport Club players
New York City FC players
Designated Players (MLS)
Major League Soccer players